Ian Patrick was the Private Secretary to the High Representative for Bosnia and Herzegovina when Lord Ashdown occupied the role, working with Edward Llewellyn. Ian was Paddy Ashdown's Private Secretary from 1998-2002, prior to going to Bosnia and features in Lord Ashdown's autobiography, A Fortunate Life which he encouraged Ashdown to write. Ian Patrick was an executor of Lord Ashdown's estate following his death, organised his memorial service at Westminster Abbey, and spoke at his funeral and the Liberal Democrat tribute to Ashdown. For his work in Bosnia Ian was awarded the MBE in the 2006 New Year Honours List. After his time with Ashdown, Ian joined the Foreign and Commonwealth Office, he left in 2015 and is currently a special advisor to Sir John Sawers GCMG.

References

External links
 A Fortunate Life, Ashdown's Biography

Living people
Secretaries
Year of birth missing (living people)